Edward Williams Clay (April 17, 1799 – December 31, 1857) was an American artist, illustrator and political cartoonist. He created the notoriously racist collection of lithographs titled Life in Philadelphia. He was also a notable comic strip pioneer.

Early life
In 1799, Edward Williams Clay was born in Philadelphia, Pennsylvania. His parents were Robert Clay and Eliza Williams. Robert Clay was a sea captain. He attended law school and as of 1825 was a member of the Pennsylvania Bar Association. He started working as an engraver while in law school. He quit his work in law and became a full-time artist.

Career

From around 1825 until 1828 he studied art in Europe. Starting in 1828 until circa 1830 he drew and published Life in Philadelphia, which today, is seen as a "pointedly racist" depiction of early African American life in Philadelphia. Starting in 1831, he focused on political cartoons. That year, he created the work "The Rats Leaving a Falling House," about Andrew Jackson.  In 1837, Clay relocated to New York City. He created illustrations and art for books, magazines, and sheet music.

Death and legacy

While still living in New York, his eyesight started to deteriorate, and he stopping working as an artist. He moved to Delaware and served as Clerk of the Court of Chancery. He also worked as Clerk of the Orphan's Court until 1856. He died in New York City in 1857 of tuberculosis. He is buried in Philadelphia at Christ Church Burial Ground.

Racial cartoons
 Life in Philadelphia (1828-1830)
"Road to Philadelphy," (ca. 1830-31), The Library Company of Philadelphia, Philadelphia, Pennsylvania

Political cartoons

References

External links

 Lambiek Comiclopedia article.
 Billy Ireland Cartoon Library & Museum Art Database

1799 births
1857 deaths
American printmakers
American cartoonists
American comics artists
Artists from Philadelphia
Painters from Pennsylvania
Lawyers from Philadelphia
19th-century deaths from tuberculosis
Artists from New York City
Tuberculosis deaths in New York (state)
19th-century American lawyers